Tomás Luis de Victoria (sometimes Italianised as da Vittoria) was the most famous Spanish composer of the Renaissance. He stands with Giovanni Pierluigi da Palestrina and Orlande de Lassus as among the principal composers of the late Renaissance, and was "admired above all for the intensity of some of his motets and of his Offices for the Dead and for Holy Week". His surviving oeuvre, unlike that of his colleagues, is almost exclusively sacred and polyphonic vocal music, set to Latin texts. As a Catholic priest, as well as an accomplished organist and singer, his career spanned both Spain and Italy. However, he preferred the life of a composer to that of a performer.

Life and career
Victoria was born in Sanchidrián in the province of Ávila, Castile, around 1548 and died in 1611. Victoria's family can be traced back for generations. Not only are the names of the members in his immediate family known, but even the occupation of his grandfather. Victoria was the seventh of nine children born to Francisco Luis de Victoria and Francisca Suárez de la Concha. His mother was of converso descent. After his father's death in 1557, his uncle, Juan Luis, became his guardian. He was a choirboy in Ávila Cathedral. Cathedral records state that his uncle, Juan Luis, presented Victoria's Liber Primus to the Church while reminding them that Victoria had been brought up in the Ávila Cathedral. Because he was such an accomplished organist, many believe that he began studying the keyboard at an early age from a teacher in Ávila. Victoria most likely began studying "the classics" at St. Giles's, a boys' school in Ávila. This school was praised by St.Teresa of Avila and other highly regarded people of music.

After receiving a grant from Philip II in 1565, Victoria went to Rome and became cantor at the German College founded by St. Ignatius Loyola. He may have studied with Palestrina around this time, though the evidence is circumstantial; certainly he was influenced by the Italian's style. For some time, beginning in 1573, Victoria held two positions, one being at the German College and the other being at the Pontifical Roman Seminary. He held the positions of chapelmaster and instructor of plainsong. In 1571, he was hired at the German College as a teacher and began earning his first steady income. After Palestrina left the Seminary, Victoria took over the position of maestro. Victoria was ordained a priest in 1574 by bishop Thomas Goldwell. Before this he was made a deacon, but did not serve long in that capacity as typically deacons became priests soon after. In 1575, Victoria was appointed Maestro di Capella at S. Apollinare. Church officials would often ask Victoria for his opinion on appointments to cathedral positions because of his fame and knowledge. He was faithful to his position as convent organist even after his professional debut as an organist. He did not stay in Italy, however.

In 1587 Philip II honoured Victoria's desire to return to his native Spain, naming him chaplain to his sister, the Dowager Empress María, daughter of Charles V, who had been living in retirement with her daughter Princess Margarita at the Monasterio de las Descalzas de St. Clara at Madrid from 1581. In 1591, Victoria became a godfather to his brother Juan Luis's daughter, Isabel de Victoria. Victoria worked for 24 years at Descalzas Reales, serving for 17 years as chaplain to the Empress until her death, and then as convent organist. Victoria was also being paid much more at the Descalzas Reales than he would have earned as a cathedral chapelmaster, receiving an annual income from absentee benefices from 1587 to 1611. When the Empress Maria died in 1603, she willed three chaplaincies in the convent, with one going to Victoria. According to Victoria, he never accepted any extra pay for being a chapelmaster, and became the organist rather than the chapelmaster. Such was the esteem in which he was held that his contract allowed him frequent travel away from the convent. He was able to visit Rome in 1593 for two years, attending Palestrina's funeral in 1594. He died in 1611 in the chaplain's residence and was buried at the convent, although his tomb has yet to be identified.

Music

Victoria is the most significant composer of the Counter-Reformation in Spain, and one of the best-regarded composers of sacred music in the late Renaissance, a genre to which he devoted himself exclusively. Victoria's music reflected his personality, expressing the passion of Spanish mysticism and religion. Victoria was praised by Padre Martini for his melodic phrases and his joyful inventions. His works have undergone a revival in the 20th century, with numerous recent recordings. Many commentators hear in his music a mystical intensity and direct emotional appeal, qualities considered by some to be lacking in the arguably more rhythmically and harmonically placid music of Palestrina. There are quite a few differences in their compositional styles, such as treatment of melody and quarter-note dissonances.

Victoria was a master at overlapping and dividing choirs with multiple parts with a gradual decreasing of rhythmic distance throughout. Not only does Victoria incorporate intricate parts for the voices, but the organ is almost treated like a soloist in many of his choral pieces. Victoria did not originate the development of psalm settings or antiphons for two choirs, but he continued and increased the popularity of such repertoire. Victoria republished works that had appeared previously, and incorporated revisions into each reissue.

Victoria published his first book of motets in 1572. In 1585 he wrote his Officium Hebdomadae Sanctae, a collection which included 37 pieces that are part of the Holy Week celebrations in the Catholic liturgy, including the eighteen motets of the Tenebrae Responsories.

Two influences in Victoria's life were Giovanni Maria Nanino and Luca Marenzio, whom Victoria admired for their work in madrigals rather than church music. It has been speculated that Victoria took lessons from Escobedo at an early age before moving to Rome.

Victoria claimed that he composed his most creative works under his patron Otto, Cardinal von Truchsess. However, Stevenson does not believe that he learned everything about music under Cardinal Truchsess's patronage. During the years that Victoria was devoted to Philip II of Spain, he expressed exhaustion from his compositional work. Most of the compositions that Victoria wrote that were dedicated to Cardinal Michele Bonelli, Philip II of Spain, or Pope Gregory XIII were not compensated properly.

Stylistically, his music shuns the elaborate counterpoint of many of his contemporaries, preferring simple line and homophonic textures, yet seeking rhythmic variety and sometimes including intense and surprising contrasts. His melodic writing and use of dissonance is more free than that of Palestrina; occasionally he uses intervals which are prohibited in the strict application of 16th century counterpoint, such as ascending major sixths, or even occasional diminished fourths (for example, a melodic diminished fourth occurs in a passage representing grief in his motet Sancta Maria, occurred). Victoria sometimes uses dramatic word-painting, of a kind usually found only in madrigals. Some of his sacred music uses instruments (a practice which is not uncommon in Spanish sacred music of the 16th century), and he also wrote polychoral works for more than one spatially separated group of singers, in the style of the composers of the Venetian school who were working at St. Mark's in Venice.

His most famous work, and his masterpiece, Officium Defunctorum, is a Requiem Mass for the Empress Maria.

Works
The number of voices are included in parentheses

Masses

  Alma redemptoris mater (8) 
  Ascendens Christus (5) 
  Ave maris stella (4) 
  Ave regina coelorum (8)
  De Beata Maria Virgine (5)
  Dum complerentur (6)
  Gaudeamus (6)
  Laetatus sum (12)
  O magnum mysterium (4)
  O quam gloriosum (4)
  Pro defunctis (4)
  Pro defunctis (6)
  Pro Victoria (9)
  Quam pulchra sunt (4)
  Quarti toni (4)
  Salve regina (8)
  Simile est regnum coelorum (4)
  Surge propera (5)
  Trahe me post te (5)
  Vidi speciosam (6)

Spurious
  Dominicalis (4)
  Pange lingua (4)

Magnificat (each sets just the odd verses polyphonically, or just the even verses, a few set all)

Odd / Even
  primi toni (4)
  secondi toni (4)
  terti toni (4)
  quarti toni (4)
  quinti toni (4)
  sexti toni (4)
  septime toni (4)
  octavi toni (4)

Both
 primi toni (8)
 sexti toni (12)

Lamentations

  Cogitavit Dominus (4)
  Ego vir videns (5)
  Et egressus est (4)
  Incipit lamentation Jeremiae (4)
  Incipit oratio Jeremiae (6)
  Manum suam (5)
  Matribus suis dixerunt (4)
  Misericordiae Domini (4)
  Quomodo obscuratum (4)

Motets
Four voices
 Beati inmaculatin 
 Benedicam Dominum 
 Date ei de fructu 
 Doctor bonus amicus Dei Andreas 
 Domine non sum dignus 
 Duo seraphim clamabant 
 Ecce sacerdos magnus 
 Ego sum panis vivus 
 Estote fortes in bello 
 Gaudent in coelis animae Sanctorum 
 Hic vir despiciens mundum 
 Iste sanctus pro lege 
 Magi viderunt stellam 
 Ne timeas, Maria 
 O decus apostolicum 
 O doctor optime 
 O magnum mysterium 
 O quam gloriosum est regnum 
 O quam metuendus 
 O regnum coeli 
 O sacrum convivium 
 O vos omnes 
 Pueri Hebraeorum 
 Quam pulchri sunt grassus tui 
 Sancta Maria, succurre miseris 
 Senex puerum portabet 
 Veni, sponsa Christi 
 Vere languores nostros

Five voices
 Ascendens Christus in altum 
 Cum beatus Ignatius 
 Descendit angelus Domini 
 Dum complerentur dies Pentecostes 
 Ecce Dominus veniet 
 Gaude, Maria virgo 	
 O lux et decus Hispaniae 
 Resplenduit facies ejus

Six Voices
 Ardens est cor meum 	
 Beata es Virgo Maria 
 Benedicta sit Sancta Trinitas 
 Congratulamini mihi 
 Nigra sum 
 O Domine Jesu Christe 
 O sacrum convivium 
 Quem vidistis, pastores 
 Surrexit Pastor Bonus 
 Trahe me post te 
 Tu es Petrus 
 Vadam, et circumibo civitatem 
 Vidi speciosam 		
 Versa est in luctum

Eight voices
 Ave Maria
 Domine in virtute tua
 O Ildephonse
 Vidi speciosam

Canticles
 Benedictus Dominus
 Nunc dimittis (4)
 Nunc dimittis (5)

Hymns
(All 4 voices except Tantum ergo, 5)
 Ad caenam agni provide
 Ad preces nostras
 Aurea luce et decore
 Ave maris stella (even verses)
 Ave maris stella (odd verses)
 Christe redemptor omnium  I 
 Christe redemptor omnium II
 Conditor alme siderum 
 Decus egregie Paule
 Deus tuorum militum
 Exultet caelum laudibus
 Hostis Herodes impie
 Huius obtentu Deus
 Iste confessor
 Jesu corona virginum
 Jesu nostra redemptio
 Lauda mater Ecclisia
 Lucis creator optime
 O lux beata Trinitas
 Pange lingua I
 Pange lingua II
 Quicumque Christum queritis
 Quodcumque vinclis (also Petrus beatus catenarum)
 Rex gloriose martyrum
 Salvete flores martyrum 
 Sanctorum meritis
 Tantum ergo sacramentum
 Te Deum laudamus
 Te lucis ante terminum
 Tibi Christe splendor patris
 Tristes errant apostoli
 Urbs beata Jerusalem
 Veni creator spiritus
 Vexilla Regis prodeunt I
 Vexilla Regis prodeunt II

Magnificats
(odd or even verses, 4 voices)
 Primi toni (4)
 Secondi toni (4)
 Terti toni (4)
 Quarti toni (4)
 Quinti toni (4)
 Sexti toni (4)
 Septime toni (4)
 Octavi toni (4)

Both
 Primi toni (8 voices)
 Sexti toni (12 voices)

Lamentations
Maundy Thursday
 Incipit lamentation Jeremiae (4)
 Et egressus est (4)
 Manum suam (5)

Good Friday
 Cogitavit Domino's (4)
 Matribus suis dixerunt (4)
 Ego vir videns (5)

Holy Saturday
 Misericordiae Domini (4)
 Quomodo obscuratum (4)
 Incipit oratio Jeremiae (6)

Lesson
 Taedet animam meam

Litany
 de beata Virgine

Passions
 St. Matthew
 St. John

Psalms
(Number, voices, [Mode, verses])
 Nisi Dominus (126, 8)
 Super flumina Babylonis (136, 8)
 Dixit Dominus (109, 8)
 Laudate pueri Dominum (112, 8)
 Laudate Dominum omnes gentes (116, 8)
 Laudate sum (121, 12)
 Ecce nunc benedicite (135, 8)
 Dixit Dominus (109, 4, I, odd)
 Confitebor tibi Domine (110, 4, 4, odd)
 Beatus vir (111, 4, 8, even)
 Laudate pueri Dominum (112, 4, 6, even)
 Lauda Jerusalem (147, 4, 7, odd)
 Confitebor tibi Domine (110, 4, 4, even)
 Beatus vir (111, 4, 8, odd)
 Nisi Dominus (126, 4, 8, odd)
 Credidi (115, 4, 6, odd)

Tenebrae Responsories

Thursday Matins
 Amicus meus
 Judas mercator pessimus
 Unus ex discipulis meis
Thursday Lauds
 Eram quasi agnus
 Una hora
 Seniores populi
Friday Matins
 Tamquam ad latronem
 Tenebrae factae sunt
 Animam meam dilectam
Friday Lauds
 Tradiderunt me
 Jesum tradidit impius
 Caligaverunt oculi mei
Saturday Matins
 Recessit pastor noster
 O vos omnes
 Ecce quomodo moritur Justus
Saturday Lauds
 Astiterunt reges terrae
 Aestimatus sum
 Sepulto Domino

Sequences
 Lauda Sion salvatorem (8)
 Victimae Paschali (8)
 Veni Sancte Spiritus (8)

Selected recordings

The following are recordings of music by Tomás Luis de Victoria. As in all of his music, the texts are in Latin and drawn from the Roman Catholic Liturgy.
 Victoria, Tenebrae Responsories. Pro Cantione Antiqua: Deutsche Harmonia Mundi CD GD77056
 Victoria, Et Jesum. Motets, antífonas y partes de miss. Carlos Mena, Juan Carlos Rivera: CD Harmonia Mundi Iberica 987042
 Victoria, Officium Defunctorum. Musica Ficta, Raúl Mallavibarrena: Enchiriadis CD EN 2006
 Victoria, Sacred Works. Ensemble Plus Ultra: DGG Archiv CD DDD 0289 477 9747 0 AM 10
 Victoria, Tenebrae Responsories. The Tallis Scholars: GIMELL. CDGIM 022
 Victoria, Lamentations of Jeremiah. The Tallis Scholars: GIMELL. CDGIM 043
 Victoria, Gesualdo, Palestrina, White, Lamentations. Nordic Voices: CHANDOS CHACONNE. CHAN 0763
 Victoria, Misas y Motetes. Ars Combinatoria, Canco López: Musaris. Mars 03-21161/16.

Select recordings of music by Victoria are discussed in an article published in March 2011 by Gramophone

Notes

References
Books

 
 
 

Journal and encyclopedia articles

Further reading
 G. Edward Bruner, DMA: "Editions and Analysis of Five Missa Beata Virgine Maria by the Spanish Composers: Morales, Guerreo, Victoria, Vivanco, and Esquivel." DMA diss., University of Illinois at Urbana-Champaign, 1980.[facsimile: University Microfilms International, Ann Arbor, MI]
 Olmos, Ángel Manuel: "El testamento y muerte de Tomás Luis de Victoria.  Nuevos familiares del músico y posible razón para su vuelta a España", Revista de Musicología, vol. XXXV, nº1 (2012), pp. 53–60
 Olmos, Ángel Manuel: "Las obras de Tomás Luis de Victoria en la tablatura para órgano de Pelplin (Polonia), Biblioteka Seminarium, 304–8, 308a (1620–1630)", en Morales, Luisa (Ed.): Cinco Siglos de Música de Tecla Española,  (Leal, 2007), pp. 87–124
 Olmos, Ángel Manuel: "Tomás Luis de Victoria et le monastère des 'Descalzas' à Madrid : réfutation d'un mythe", Le Jardin de Musique, I/2, (2004) pp. 121–128
 Olmos, Ángel Manuel: "Aportaciones a la temprana historia musical de la capilla de las Descalzas Reales (1587–1608)", Revista de Musicología, vol. XXVI, nº 2 2003, pp. 439–489

External links

 
 
 
 
 Victoria dedicated website, in Spanish and English
 Recordings of Victoria by the Umeå Academic Choir

1548 births
1611 deaths
People from the Province of Ávila
Spanish classical composers
Spanish male classical composers
Musicians from Castile and León
Renaissance composers
16th-century composers
Spanish Roman Catholic priests
Oratorians